The 2015 AFF Women's Championship was the eighth edition of the AFF Women's Championship, an international women's football tournament organised by the ASEAN Football Federation (AFF). The tournament was held in Ho Chi Minh City, Vietnam between 1–10 May 2015. Eight teams played in the tournament.

Thailand won the tournament for the second time after beating Myanmar 3–2 in the final.

Venues

Participating teams
The following 8 teams took part in the tournament at Ho Chi Minh City, Vietnam:

 
 
 
 
 
 
 
  (Hosts)

Squads

Group stage
All times listed are Indochina Time (UTC+7)

Group A

Group B

Knockout stage

Semi-finals

Third place match

Final

Awards

Goalscorers

9 goals
 Nisa Romyen

6 goals

 Alisa Rukpinij
 Nguyễn Thị Minh Nguyệt

4 goals

 Khin Moe Wai
 Naw Ar Lo Wer Phaw
 Nguyễn Thị Tuyết Dung
 Huỳnh Như

3 goals

 Princess Ibini
 Win Theingi Tun
 Joana Houplin
 Orathai Srimanee

2 goals

 Beattie Goad
 Emily Condon
 Jordan Baker
 Kobie Ferguson
 Yee Yee Oo
 Anootsara Maijarern
 Wilaiporn Boothduang

1 goal

 Alexandra Chidiac
 Amy Harrison
 Emma Checker
 Olivia Price
 Erma Karafir
 Noum Angmansongsa
 Vannida Soukpanhya
 Jesse Shugg
 Kanjana Sungngoen
 Naphat Seesraum
 Pikul Khueanpet
 Rattikan Thongsombut
 Taneekarn Dangda
 Nguyễn Thị Nguyệt
 Nguyễn Thị Liễu
 Trần Thị Hồng Nhung
 Trần Thị Thùy Trang

Final ranking

References

External links
  
  

3
2015
2015 in Vietnamese football
2015